Michela Angeloni (born 25 September 1984) is an Italian ice hockey player. She competed in the women's tournament at the 2006 Winter Olympics.

References

1984 births
Living people
Italian women's ice hockey players
Olympic ice hockey players of Italy
Ice hockey players at the 2006 Winter Olympics
Sportspeople from Bergamo
European Women's Hockey League players